Ecoglasnost, also known as Independent Society of Ecoglasnost, is an independent Bulgarian environmental organization, established on 11 April 1989 and formally registered on 11 December 1989.  Ecoglasnost became a founding member of the umbrella opposition movement Union of Democratic Forces on 7 December 1989, and gave rise to the Green Party of Bulgaria on 28 December 1989, the Political Club of Ecoglasnost in March 1990, and the National Movement of Ecoglasnost on 15 June 1991.

Focusing its activities on several major environmental,
human rights and political issues, the organization rapidly gained public support to become the leading opposition to the Communist Party:

In particular, Ecoglasnost organized public petitions, lobbying and demonstrations against the controversial projects of diverting Struma and Mesta Rivers waters to the north, and building the Belene Nuclear Power Plant.  Position papers and reports on these issues and on the preservation of Bulgarian nature heritage were disseminated as samizdat, made available to domestic and Western media, and submitted to national authorities as well as to the 35-nation CSCE Meeting on the Protection of the Environment held in Sofia from 16 October to 3 November 1989.

Ecoglasnost played an important role in the political process that lead to the regime change marked by the downfall of the longtime communist ruler Todor Zhivkov on 10 November 1989, paving the way to the restoration of democracy and market economy in Bulgaria:

Notes

1989 establishments in Bulgaria
Nature conservation organisations based in Europe
Environmental organizations based in Bulgaria
Organizations established in 1989
Politics of Bulgaria